BrightBuilt Barn is a Net Zero, LEED Platinum home in Rockport, Maine, built in 2008 to demonstrate certain principles of sustainable building design and construction. It was named the Most Innovative Home Project of the Year by the U.S. Green Building Council, and has been featured in numerous green blogs, design magazines, The New York Times, National Public Radio, a documentary film, and an international television news report. It is the subject of a 10-year retrospective review in the upcoming Northeast Sustainable Energy Association annual meeting in March 2018.

The goals of the team behind BrightBuilt Barn were two-fold: to demonstrate in a compelling project the principles of sustainable building that the team believed essential for future structures; and to bring together a critical mass of green designers and builders to help create an "ecosystem" of green building in Maine, modelled on the ecosystem of technology start-ups in Silicon Valley.

Features
1. Superinsulation - By insulating the structure beyond conventional norms, the energy demands for heating were radically reduced, allowing the structure to have no furnace and still be warm during the winters of Maine.

2. Solar powered - All energy for the Barn is produced by solar power. An array of photovoltaic solar panels on the south-facing roof creates electricity for lighting, the pump for the solar hot water system, and the backup heat pump. The solar panels create enough excess energy to power both the Barn and the conventional home that also sits on the property. Heat is produced by a roof-mounted solar hot water system, backed up by a high-efficiency heat pump.

3. LED lighting - The Barn was a pioneer in using LED lighting to radically reduce the energy demand and material waste associated with incandescent bulbs.

4. Grid tied - Although designed to exist off the electrical grid if necessary or desired, the Barn is tied to the local electrical grid. It feeds electricity into the grid on sunny days, and draws electricity from the grid at night.

References

External links
Maine Home and Design article
 Kaplan Thompson Architects

Buildings and structures completed in 2008
Buildings and structures in Rockland, Maine
2008 establishments in Maine